Liberate the People (YAW,) is a Senegalese political coalition led by Ousmane Sonko. The coalition opposes President Macky Sall and allies against him with the Wallu Sénégal alliance led by the Democratic Party of Senegal.

The party participated in the 2022 local elections, winning in several major cities, including Dakar. After the 2022 national election the coalition became the second biggest in the National Assembly and the main opposition force against Macky Sall obtaining 56 seats.

Composition
The coalition is composed of the following parties:

Electoral history

National Assembly elections

References

Political parties in Senegal
Elections in Senegal
Political party alliances in Senegal
Political parties established in 2021